Road number may refer to:

 Route number of a road
 Running number of a locomotive